"The Liberation of Earth" is a science fiction short story by American author William Tenn, written in 1950, first published in 1953, and reprinted several times in various anthologies, including 1955   collection Of all Possible Worlds and 1967  anthology  The Starlit Corridor. The story, which Tenn described as having been inspired by the Korean War, portrays Earth as the battleground between two powerful alien races, the Troxxt and the Dendi, who repeatedly "liberate" it from each other.

At the time the story begins, the Troxxt and the Dendi have long since abandoned the (literally) shattered remnants of Earth as being too dangerous for civilized people; humanity is nearly extinct, with the few survivors having descended into starving savagery as they struggle for air.

Plot summary
The story is told from the point of view of the future descendants of the humans that were nearly annihilated after being repeatedly "liberated" by two warring races.

Aliens arrive in an enormous spaceship and set up a base in southern France. When it is discovered their language bears some resemblance to Bengali, humanity is finally able to talk to the aliens. They learn the "Dendi", part of the great Galactic Federation, are setting up a communications relay as part of the galactic war with the evil "Troxxt". The Dendi are otherwise uncommunicative, except for one point when they tell humans to abandon the area of Washington, DC where they need to set up a huge building which is later understood to be a recreation hall.

The Troxxt arrive and a battle breaks out, killing millions before the Dendi escape to their ship, blasting Marseille to dust when they leave. The Troxxt land and take what appear to be hostages, but later emerge having been trained as interpreters. They explain that the Dendi are not part of the Galactic Federation, but the only real member, and the war is actually one between carbon and silicon based life forms. The Troxxt are fellow carbons, and invite humanity to join them in their great crusade to free protoplasmic life from the Dendi. After killing anyone who collaborated with the Dendi, they work thousands to death in a great effort to defend the planet.

A Dendi fleet arrives and millions more die in the ensuing battle before the eventual reliberation. The Dendi explain the real war is between vertebrates and the evil worm-like Troxxt, asking how humanity could be so easily taken in by invertebrate propaganda? Several more re-reliberations ensue, sinking Australia, destroying Venus and changing the planet's orbit. Eventually what remains of Earth is a pear-shaped cinder in an elliptical orbit, abandoned by both sides as it is no longer safe enough to be used as a war zone.

The remaining humans are proud of their role in the Great War, and happy to be free of the drudgery of maintaining civilization while they gasp to breath enough of the remaining air to pass the story to their children.

Critical response
Nick Gevers has described "The Liberation of Earth" as "great", and Locus columnist Rich Horton described it as "one of 1953's best shorts". In 1986, it was included in the anthology Isaac Asimov Presents The Great SF Stories 15 as one of the best science fiction short stories of 1953. It was also reprinted in the 2016 anthology The Big Book of Science Fiction. Editors Ann and Jeff VanderMeer state that it is "considered one of the classic science fiction stories of all time."

References

Sources
 Tenn, William.  Immodest Proposals: The Complete Science Fiction of William Tenn, Volume 1. New England Science Fiction Association, 2001. .

External links
 
 "The Liberation of Earth" at the Internet Archive

1953 short stories
Science fiction short stories
Fiction about Earth
Works by William Tenn